Estádio Raimundo Sampaio, more commonly known as Independência, is a football stadium located in the Horto neighborhood of Belo Horizonte, Minas Gerais, Brazil. It was built in 1950 for the FIFA World Cup, held in Brazil. Initially its capacity was 30,000 people, but after the reconstruction between 2010 and 2012, the capacity is approximately 23,000 people. It belonged to the defunct Sete de Setembro Futebol Clube, which is why the stadium is called Independence (the name of the team, September 7, is Brazil's Independence Day). The stadium is currently property of América Futebol Clube, but has been leased to the Minas Gerais state government for 20 years, as a counterpart to the injection of public resources to demolish the old stadium and build the new one.

Estádio Independência is the second most important stadium in Belo Horizonte, behind only Mineirão. Its formal name honors Raimundo Sampaio, a former chairman of Sete de Setembro. América plays their home games in there.

History
Construction started in 1947, in preparation for the 1950 FIFA World Cup. The inaugural match was the World Cup match between Yugoslavia and Switzerland, won by the former by 3–0, and played on June 25, 1950. The first stadium goal was scored by Tomasevic. One of the most famous upsets in FIFA World Cup history was played here, the 1-0 upset by the United States over England at that 1950 World Cup.

After the construction of Mineirão, ownership of the stadium was transferred by the Minas Gerais government to Sete de Setembro.

Originally the stadium belonged to the Government of Minas Gerais, but with the inauguration of Mineirão in 1965, became the property of the club Sete de Setembro (the reason the stadium is popularly known as "Independence", according to the historical date). With the merger of this club with América, the latter became the owner. At this stage América won Campeonato Brasileiro Série B in 1997 in the confrontation against Vila Nova-GO and in a match against Náutico. For  the final phase 18,900 paying fans attended. América also won at that stage the Brazilian  Series C Championship in 2009.

In 1999, in partnership with Atlético, América built a metal-structure grandstand, increasing the stadium capacity to about 30,000 people, plus an electronic scoreboard. Owing to a lack of proper security, this grandstand was deactivated shortly thereafter. The end of the partnership also resulted in the removal of the scoreboard. Independência already served as a venue for music festivals, such as Pop Rock Brazil and the Axé Brazil.

The attendance record is 32,721 spectators, set in the match between  Minas Gerais and Guanabara (Carioca), won by Minas Gerais 1–0, and played on January 27, 1963, it was the first final match of the 1962 Campeonato Brasileiro de Seleções Estaduais, played by state teams.

Renovation

In 2010, Independência was demolished apart from its dressing rooms, and a brand new stadium was built in its place to host the games of Atlético Mineiro and América Mineiro while Mineirão went through renovations to host the 2014 FIFA World Cup. During the stadium's renovation, all three Belo Horizonte teams played in the Arena do Jacaré, located in nearby city Sete Lagoas. In 2012, the renovation was completed and América Mineiro returned to its original home venue, which is being also used to host games of Atlético Mineiro.

1950 FIFA World Cup

In the 1950 FIFA World Cup, the Independência hosted three matches in the Group Stage, including the notable upset United States vs England.

References

Enciclopédia do Futebol Brasileiro, Volume 2 - Lance, Rio de Janeiro: Aretê Editorial S/A, 2001.

External links
Templos do Futebol
WebGalo
América official website

Estadio Independencia
América Futebol Clube (MG)
Independencia
Football venues in Minas Gerais
Independencia
Football in Belo Horizonte
Sports venues completed in 1950